Up All Night is an American television sitcom created by Emily Spivey that aired on NBC from September 14, 2011, to December 13, 2012. The show starred Christina Applegate, Will Arnett, Jennifer Hall, Luka Jones, and Maya Rudolph.

Synopsis
The series follows Reagan (Christina Applegate), a producer on her best friend Ava's (Maya Rudolph) talk show, and Chris (Will Arnett), Reagan's supportive, stay-at-home husband, as they try to adjust to life with their newborn baby Amy.

The second season focuses on the cancellation of Ava's talk show, and Chris starting a business with Reagan's brother Scott (Luka Jones). Reagan also struggles to adjust to her new role as a stay-at-home mother.

Development and production

Conception
The series was based on creator Emily Spivey's life when she went back to working on Saturday Night Live after giving birth to a baby boy. Due to the nature of her job, she was required to take care of the baby and work late nights. She decided she wanted to make a show based on those extremes. NBC executives were "supportive and excited" for the new series. On February 1, 2011, Up All Night received a pilot order, written by creator Spivey and directed by James Griffiths, under the title Alpha Mom. The series was officially picked up for 13 episodes at the NBC upfronts on May 15, 2011 under its final title, Up All Night.

After the success of Maya Rudolph's movie Bridesmaids, Up All Night went through some retooling which now has her character Ava, as a talk-show host, and Reagan now as the show's producer, instead of them being PR executives. Spivey said the character change allowed Ava to be more fun. Some media critics compared the character change to Rudolph's impersonation of Oprah Winfrey on Saturday Night Live. The series was later given a full-season pickup on October 4, 2011. On November 21, 2011, NBC added two additional episodes to season one, bringing the total to 24 episodes.

It was also the last show to be produced by Universal Media Studios, along with Free Agents and Whitney.

Crew
The series is produced by Broadway Video and Universal Media Studios. The series was created by Emily Spivey who serves as executive producer alongside Lorne Michaels, Jon Pollack, and Erin David. David had worked with Spivey and Michaels on Saturday Night Live while Pollack had worked with Michaels on 30 Rock. Series co-star Christina Applegate also works as a producer on the series alongside Eric Kranzler and Andrew Singer.

Cancellation

In October 2012, it was announced that Up All Night would go on hiatus eleven episodes into its second season to convert from a single-camera setup to a multiple-camera setup shot in front of a live audience. During the hiatus, series creator Emily Spivey and star Christina Applegate left the show and Will Arnett was cast in a CBS pilot, which eventually became the two-season series The Millers.

After months of rumors of cancellations, Up All Night was officially canceled by NBC on May 9, 2013 after two seasons and was not renewed for a third season.

Cast and characters

Main cast and characters

 Christina Applegate as Reagan Brinkley, a producer for the Ava show, who goes back to work after giving birth. Applegate was interested in the series early on, especially because she had recently had a child. Applegate was also offered several other roles for the pilot season. Applegate was the first cast member signed on to the series. She is credited as a producer for the series.
 Will Arnett as Chris Brinkley, a former lawyer and now stay-at-home dad. Arnett was the third main cast member to sign on to the series.
 Maya Rudolph as Ava Alexander, the host of the Ava show and Reagan's best friend. Rudolph was the second main cast member to sign on to the series Rudolph had previously worked with the series creator on SNL and Spivey had wanted to work with Rudolph before the series plot was established.
 Jennifer Hall (Season 1) as Missy, Ava's assistant. Hall was the final member to sign on to the series and was initially a recurring actor. She was officially added to the main cast list in the fifth episode, "Mr. Bob's Toddler Kaleidoscope". Due to retooling of the show for the second season, she did not return as a series regular.
 Luka Jones (Season 2) as Scott Chafin, Reagan's laid-back brother, who moves back to town with his son after going through a divorce. Jones joined the main cast at the start of season two.

Recurring cast and characters
 Matt Braunger as Gene Marden, Terry's husband and Reagan and Chris's next door neighbor.
Jean Villepique as Terry Marden, Gene's wife and Reagan and Chris's next door neighbor.
 Jason Lee as Kevin, Reagan and Chris's next door neighbor who dated Ava.
 Molly Shannon as Nancy, Amy's babysitter. Shannon was initially a one-time guest star, before the producers asked her to appear in another episode. Her second episode aired in early 2012. She is a former cast member of Saturday Night Live and previously worked with Michaels on the series.
 Nick Cannon as Calvin, Ava's co-host on her talk show.
 Chris Diamantopoulos as Julian, Ava's eccentric ex-boyfriend.
 Will Forte as Reed, Chris's gamer friend, who is also a father.
 Carly and Delaney Prince as Amy
 Steven Pasquale as Luke Granby, the new boss of the Ava show, who has a hard time getting along with Ava and Reagan.
 Megan Mullally as Shayna Mund, a competing talk show host, who Ava and Reagan helped lose a large amount of weight during segments of the Ava show.
 Mary Elizabeth Ellis as Connie Chafin
 Quinn Friedman as Kyle Chafin
 Rob Huebel as Jerry, Chris's obnoxious college roommate, and Ava's boyfriend.
 Ben Falcone as Justin, Reagan and Chris's neighbor.
 Chloe Csengery as McKenna
 Sean Hayes as Walter
 Adam Gregor as Barry
 Blythe Danner as Dr. Angie Chafin, Reagan's heavily critical psychologist mother. She first appeared in "Parents", and then tried to be a better mother and grandmother in "First Christmas".

Several guest actors have also appeared. Richard Schiff appeared in "Parents" as Reagan's dad. Alanis Morissette appeared in "Travel Day" as a former partner in an R&B duo with Ava. Stevie Nicks appeared in the episode titled "Letting Go" as herself, and former Saturday Night Live writer Jorma Taccone, has appeared on the show in "Working Late and Working It". The "Daddy Daughter Time" featured a cameo by Sharon Osbourne as Ava's rival over a parking space and Ava's father is played by Henry Winkler.

Episodes

Reception

Broadcast
Up All Night premiered in the 10:00 pm timeslot behind America's Got Talent with Free Agents following it. The following week it was moved to its regular timeslot at 8:00 pm, and was eventually the only comedy after Free Agents was cancelled. Starting January 12, the series was moved behind NBC's hit series, The Office, switching timeslots with Whitney. Some media critics have said that the goal for moving the series was in order to make it more of a ratings success, like The Office.

Reviews

Up All Night has received mostly positive reviews from critics. The first season currently holds a score of 64 out of 100 on Metacritic, indicating generally positive reviews. Many critics said that the series felt like two different shows in one. HitFix reviewer Daniel Feinberg gave the series pilot a positive review, but disliked the office settings and the writing for Rudolph's character commenting that "Will Arnett and Christina Applegate are playing parents, but Maya Rudolph is playing a sitcom character". Despite this, the performance of the main cast members has received praise from critics. Some critics compared Rudolph's role to her impersonation of Oprah Winfrey while she was on SNL, which Rudolph firmly denied saying "I have yet to see the similarities between my character and Oprah". Some publications declared it among the best TV shows of 2011, new or old, including Slant Magazine and Hulu.

Slate writer Hanna Rosin has praised the show in particular for slowly subverting the sitcom archetype of the father incompetent at managing the household.

The show then went further, she recalled, by then assigning the usual role of a sitcom dad to Reagan. "[She] turned into a version of Ralph Kramden, prone to tantrums and meddling," Rosin writes. "Like the classic doltish dad, she creates elaborate schemes to fix domestic problems but only winds up making everything worse. And then Chris swoops in, Alice-style, to make it all better."

Ratings
During its first season, Up All Night was a moderate success in the ratings by network's standards (at the time, NBC was the fourth highest-rated network out of five networks). The series had ranked  as NBC's fourth highest rated scripted series after The Office, Smash and Law & Order: Special Victims Unit among adults between the ages of 18 and 49. The series also ranked as one of the most digitally recorded series of the season. Due to the moderate success, the series was given a full season pick up alongside Whitney. The cost for an ad for the series was approximately $82,617 per 30-second commercial.

Awards and nominations

References

External links

 
2010s American single-camera sitcoms
2011 American television series debuts
2012 American television series endings
English-language television shows
NBC original programming
Television series by Broadway Video
Television series by Universal Television
Television shows set in Los Angeles
Television series created by Emily Spivey